Drunk in Public is the first CD released by American comedian Ron White. It was released on November 3, 2003 on the Hip-O Records label. The album has been certified gold by the RIAA.

Track listing
All tracks written by White.
 "Sunglasses" - 2:05
 "Truth in Advertising" - 0:50
 "Plane Crash" - 3:00
 "Cincinnati Chili" - 1:38
 "Hurricane George" - 1:32
 "I Drink Too Much…" - 0:42
 "Ten Days in Los Angeles" - 2:56
 "Outlaw Video Games" - 2:28
 "Cousin Ray" - 3:17
 "Married a Wealthy Woman" - 3:54
 "Cheating in Columbus" - 3:13
 "Osama Bin Laden" - 1:50
 "Lug Nut Day" - 3:53
 "Car Salesman" - 1:48
 "They Call Me 'Tater Salad'" - 6:31

Charts

Weekly charts

Year-end charts

Certifications

References

External links
[ Drunk in Public] at Allmusic

2003 live albums
2003 debut albums
Ron White albums
Hip-O Records live albums